Monoxenus spinator is a species of beetle in the family Cerambycidae. It was described by Kolbe in 1893.

It's 10–10.5 mm long and 4.5–4.75 mm wide.

References

spinator
Beetles described in 1893